Dunveth is a hamlet in the parish of Wadebridge, Cornwall, England, UK.

References

Hamlets in Cornwall